The 2010 Royal Trophy was the fourth edition of the Royal Trophy, a team golf event contested between teams representing Asia and Europe. It was held from  8–10 January at the Amata Spring Country Club in Thailand. Europe regained the trophy by a score of 8½ points to 7½.

Teams

Schedule
8 January (Friday)  Foursomes x 4
9 January (Saturday)  Four-ball x 4
10 January (Sunday)  Singles x 8

Friday's matches (foursomes)

Saturday's matches (four-ball)

Sunday's matches (singles)

References

External links
Official site
Results and reports from Golf Today

Royal Trophy
Golf tournaments in Thailand
Royal Trophy
Royal Trophy
Royal Trophy